Sixto Vera Espínola (born 27 April 1965) is a Paraguayan former professional boxer who competed from 1990 to 2007. As an amateur, he represented his country in the flyweight division at the 1988 Summer Olympics, where he lost his first bout against Bishnu Bahadur Singh.

1988 Olympic results
Below is the record of Sixto Vera, a flyweight boxer from Paraguay who competed at the 1988 Seoul Olympics:

 Round of 64: lost to Bishnu Bahadur Singh (Nepal) by decision, 0-5

References

External links
 

1965 births
Living people
Paraguayan male boxers
Olympic boxers of Paraguay
Boxers at the 1988 Summer Olympics
Flyweight boxers
Light-flyweight boxers
Mini-flyweight boxers
People from Caaguazú Department